Seetharamayya Gari Manavaralu ( Seetharamayya's granddaughter) is a 1991 Indian Telugu-language drama film  directed by Kranthi Kumar, and produced by V. Doraswamy Raju under the VMC Productions banner. The film stars Akkineni Nageswara Rao, Rohini Hattangadi, and Meena with the music composed by M. M. Keeravani. Based on the novel Navvina Kanneelle by Manasa, the plot follows Seetha (Meena) who arrives from the US to visit her grandparents, Seetharamayya (Rao) and Janakamma (Hattangadi) who are uninformed of her parents' accidental death.

It was featured in the 15th IFFI' 92 Indian Panorama section. The film won three Filmfare Awards South, three Nandi Awards and four Cinema Express Awards. The film was remade in Malayalam as Sandhwanam (1991), in Kannada as Belli Modagalu (1992), and in Hindi as Udhaar Ki Zindagi (1994).

Plot
Seetaramayya a rich landlord and the lead-off person whose word is an ordinance to the entire village. He leads a delightful life with his ideal wife Janakamma and son Dr.Srinivasa Murthy / Vasu. Both father and son share the beyond relation as friends, unfortunately, a rift arises between them regarding the Vasu's espousal. As Vasu not able to deceive his love interest Sumathi, he denies the match seen by his father. So, Seetaramayya has to bow his head down for the first time. But he arrays resent by not talking with his son which makes Vasu distress and leaves the country. After 20 years, Vasu's daughter Seeta reach the village to attend a marriage function. Seetaramayya still continues his dislike on Vasu which he reflects on Seeta too but inherently he loves them a lot. Right now, Seeta wins everyone's heart in the house with her wit and also resolves the family disputes of Seetaramayya with his in-law Veerabhadraiah. At that point in time, Dr.Vivekam, the friend of Vasu lands when as a flabbergast, it is revealed that Seeta has hidden the secret of her parents' death as she well knows that her grandparents cannot withstand after perceiving the truth. Understanding the situation, Vivakam conveys to Seetaramayya and Janakamma that their son and daughter-in-law are coming soon. At present, everyone decides to perform his 60th birthday Sashtipurthi to Seetaramayya when he is eagerly waiting for his son's arrival but his absence annoys him. Immediately, Seeta calms him down and grandly celebrates the function. Soon after, an awful incident, Janakamma passes away due to a heart attack when Seetaramayya woes as Vasu not even attended to his mother's final rights. Out of the pain, he asks Seeta to leave the house which she does so. Thereafter, Seeta's memories recall Seetaramayya when he spots her diary through which he learns the reality and also his son's last wish to immerse his ashes into river Godavari by his father. Here, Seetaramayya gets collapsed but quickly retrieves, and rushes for Seeta. At last, Seeta fulfills her father's wish.

Cast

Akkineni Nageshwara Rao as Seetharamayya
Rohini Hattangadi as Janakamma
Meena as Seeta
Dasari Narayana Rao as Subbaraju
Kota Srinivasa Rao as Veerabhadraiah
Murali Mohan as Dr. Vivekam
Tanikella Bharani as Govinda Rao 
Sudhakar as Pavan Kumar
Sudarshan as Kaasi
Narayana Rao as Lawyer Chakravarthy 
Raja as Dr. Srinivasa Murthy / Vaasu
Chidatala Appa Rao 
Telangana Shakuntala 
Sudha Rani as Sumathi
Srilatha as Shyamala 
Chandrika as Chinna Papa
Saraswathi 
Master Amith as Banty

Soundtrack

Music composed by M. M. Keeravani. Lyrics were written by Veturi. Music released on SURYA Music Company.

Reception

Awards
Filmfare Awards
 Best Film – Telugu – V. Doraswamy Raju – won
 Best Director – Telugu – Kranthi Kumar – won
 Best Actor – Telugu – Akkineni Nageswara Rao– won

Nandi Awards - 1990
 Second Best Feature Film - Silver – V. Doraswamy Raju 
 Best Director – T. Kranthi Kumar
 Best Female Playback Singer – K.S. Chithra for "Kaliki Chilkala Koliki"

Cinema Express Awards
Best Film – VMC Productions – won
Best Actor – Akkineni Nageswara Rao – won
Best Actress – Meena  – won
Best Director – Kranthi Kumar – won

References

External links
 

1991 films
Films scored by M. M. Keeravani
Telugu films remade in other languages
Indian drama films
1990s Telugu-language films
Films directed by Kranthi Kumar
1991 drama films